Perfect Solution is a 2001 studio album by The Hobos. It was the follow-up to their successful debut Numbvision. Like its predecessor, Perfect Solution gained praise both from the public and the critics. It also won the "Latvian Rock Album of the Year" award in 2001.

Perfect Solution marks the first time a Latvian band released a CD with expanded media features, in this case a music video of their first album hit "Christian (I’m Gonna Be)". The album is also notable for being recorded at the Abbey Road Studios.

"Midnight Lovers", "Take-off" and "Can You Love" were released as radio singles.

Track listing
All songs by Rolands Ūdris.
"Midnight Lovers" – 3:19
"Yours Beautiful" – 3:17
"Heaven on Green" – 5:24
"Sunrise" – 3:20
"Angel Joo" – 4:32
"Speed" – 4:40
"Womy Not" – 2:09
"Domestic Animals" – 4:41
"Take-off" – 2:57
"Can You Love" – 2:28
"Outhouse" – 3:23
"Perfect Solution" – 3:09

References

2001 albums
The Hobos albums